Chynowie  is a village in the administrative district of Gmina Gniewino, within Wejherowo County, Pomeranian Voivodeship, in northern Poland.

The village has a population of 516.

References

Chynowie